Mazatlán F.C. is a football club based in Mazatlán, that competes in Liga MX.

The club was formed in 2020 after the sale and relocation of Monarcas Morelia.

Key

Key to league:
 Pos. = Final position
 Pl. = Played
 W = Games won
 D = Games drawn
 L = Games lost
 GF = Goals scored
 GA = Goals against
 Pts = Points

Key to rounds:
 C = Champion
 F = Final (Runner-up)
 SF = Semi-finals
 QF = Quarter-finals
 R16/R32 = Round of 16, round of 32, etc.
 RE = Playoff round for liguilla
 GS = Group stage
 W/O = Withdrawn from competition

Top scorers shown in italics with number of goals scored in bold  are players who were also top scorers in the Liga MX that season.

Seasons